Frederick Stafford (11 March 1928 – 28 July 1979) was a Czechoslovak-born actor.  Born Friedrich Strobel von Stein, he spoke fluent Czech, German, English, French and Italian, and was a leading man in European spy-movies and in Alfred Hitchcock's Topaz.

Biography

Early life
By some accounts, Stafford claimed to have played water polo at the 1948 Summer Olympics.

He was the son of a Slovak factory owner. He studied chemistry and spent time in Switzerland. He was worried about the Russians taking over Czechoslovakia and in 1948 decided to leave. It would take too long to move to the US or Canada so he went to Australia in 1949.  While there he changed his name to "Frederick Stafford". "I always liked the name," he later said.

He became a taxi driver, a lumberjack and a businessman. He qualified as a doctor of chemistry after university in Sydney and Perth. Fluent in five languages, in the 1950s he held a series of positions in the pharmaceutical industry.

By 1962 he was a regional manager for Bristol Meyers headquartered in Hong Kong. He travelled for them in the Middle East and Far East. Two years later in Bangkok he met a German actress Marianne Hold and married her seven days later.

Film career
In 1964 French director André Hunebelle discovered Stafford on holiday at a hotel in Bangkok and asked him "How would you like to make movies with me?"  Stafford replied, "Why not?" 

According to another account "I married an Austrian girl in Bangkok in 1964 and among the bouquets at the wedding was one from a French film producer. He said he wanted me to star in his films. That's how it all began. I was rushed off to Brazil to make my first film in Rio de Janeiro, and have been busy ever since."

He played a starring role in his first film, replacing Kerwin Mathews as an agent code-named OSS 117 in OSS 117 Mission for a Killer (1965) with Mylène Demongeot. The film was the eleventh biggest movie of the year in France.

"Getting into a different industry didn't have a big effect on me," said Stafford later. "I don't think it made a difference because I didn't get into business at an early age when a man is still being formed... I don't know if there is such a thing as luck... Maybe in a lottery but you have to get out and buy the ticket first."

He followed this with the similar Agent 505: Death Trap in Beirut (1965) and a second OSS117 film, Atout cœur à Tokyo pour OSS 117 (1966).

Stafford made a macaroni combat war film in Italy, Dirty Heroes (1967) with John Ireland. He followed it with Estouffade à la Caraïbe (1967), and L'Homme qui valait des milliards (1967).

Stafford made two more Italian war films, The Battle of El Alamein (1969) with Michael Rennie.

Topaz
These movies brought the attention of Alfred Hitchcock, who signed him in 1968 to play the leading role as agent André Devereaux in Topaz (1969). Universal signed him to a non exclusive contract for seven years. In the role of the secret agent, he led an ensemble of first-rate European actors who were his film partners in a very complex role: Dany Robin was his wife, Claude Jade played his daughter, Michel Subor as his son-in-law, Michel Piccoli and Philippe Noiret were the spies he had to expose and Karin Dor played the role of the Cuban mistress. His contractor was played by the American John Forsythe. 

The film was not a success.  The casting of Stafford, whose performance was found lacking by critics, was largely blamed for its failure. Channel4 claimed, "Heading the international cast is a very wooden Stafford, who is no Cary Grant."

He made Eagles Over London (1969) with Van Johnson.

In March 1970 Stafford claimed that Harry Saltzman wanted him to play James Bond in On Her Majesty's Secret Service but he was unable to accept due to his commitment to make Topaz. He said "although at first I thought no one could take over from Sean. But after seeing the latest Bond film... I know I can." He added "I certainly didn't realise this film business would keep my interest like it has. It is a real change from chemistry, and at present I can't see myself going back to that."

Later career

He made a comeback in 1972 as Commissario Luca Micelli in the Italian Giallo Shadows Unseen.

Five years after Topaz, he starred with French actress Claude Jade (who had played his daughter in Topaz) in the Italian thriller Special Killers (1973). In that movie, Stafford's character has a brief platonic romance with Jade's character despite a 20-year age difference.

His last successes were the Spanish Movies Metti che ti rompo il muso (1975) and White Horses of Summer (1975, starring Jean Seberg, his co-star from 1966  Estouffade à la Caraïbe), the Italian thriller Werewolf Woman (1976) and the Spanish-Italian-French coproduction Hold-Up (1977). He also made La trastienda and Sfida sul fondo.

In 1977 Stafford returned to Australia after 15 years. He announced he intended to make four films in Australia including one about the pyjama girl murder; Our Man in Sydney, a detective thriller, and Andamooka, about life on the Australian opal fields.

Personal life
He married German actress Marianne Hold whom he met whilst both of them were in Bangkok. His son is the singer Roderick Stafford, who was born in 1964.

Death
Stafford died in 1979 in a collision of two aircraft above Lake Sarnen, Switzerland. A Morane-Saulnier Rallye piloted by Czech-born Pavel Krahulec, M.D., and in which Stafford was a passenger collided with a Piper aircraft, piloted by businessman Alois Fischer of Thoune, Switzerland

Films

References

External links
 

1928 births
1979 deaths
Austrian male film actors
Austrian people of Czech descent
Czechoslovak male film actors
American people of Austrian descent
American people of Czech descent
20th-century Austrian male actors
Carpathian German people